First London was a bus company operating services in east and west Greater London, England. It was a subsidiary of FirstGroup and operated buses under contract to Transport for London. It was formed in the late 1990s through the acquisition of three London bus operators. First London's garages were sold off between December 2007 and June 2013 with the last closing in September 2013.

Company history

FirstGroup was formed as FirstBus on 16 May 1995, through the merger of Badgerline and the GRT Group.

Although what became First London was established in 1997, FirstBus could trace its involvement in London bus services back to 1990 when Badgerline acquired Eastern National, the Essex-based former National Bus Company subsidiary that had operated numerous routes in East London since tendering began in 1985. These operations were subsequently transferred to a new division, Thamesway Buses, before being recombined with Eastern National in the late 1990s as First Essex.

In March 1997, FirstBus purchased CentreWest, which had been established in April 1989 as a subsidiary of London Regional Transport before being sold in a management buyout during the privatisation of London bus services in September 1994. Since 1993 CentreWest had been using local identities based on each of its garages, such as Ealing Buses at Greenford garage and Challenger at Alperton garage, and in March 1996 it had acquired Southall based London Buslines from the Q-Drive group. All these identities were originally retained, buses receiving new-style fleetnames incorporating FirstBus's corporate f logo.

In December 1997, FirstBus rebranded as FirstGroup. Subsequently, CentreWest was renamed First CentreWest, while the buses' fleetnames were revised again so that "First" was prominent, the local identities becoming secondary.

On 8 July 1998, FirstGroup purchased Capital Citybus. It was subsequently renamed First Capital.

In March 2001, First consolidated the CentreWest and Capital operations under the First London brand. Both were managed from CentreWest's head office beside Paddington station, as was First Berkshire & The Thames Valley, the former Beeline operation that had also been acquired by CentreWest from Q-Drive in 1996. The London Buslines operation was wound down, with its routes, buses and license all being transferred to CentreWest by September 2001.

In December 2007 the company's Orpington business, which had been established by CentreWest in 1995, was sold to Metrobus, along with 35 buses. In March 2012, Northumberland Park garage was sold to London General.

In June 2013, FirstGroup sold Alperton, Greenford, Hayes, Uxbridge and Willesden Junction garages with 494 buses to Metroline and Atlas Road (Park Royal), Lea Interchange (Leyton) and Westbourne Park garages with 412 buses to Tower Transit.

First London ceased operating on 27 September 2013 after its remaining contracts with Transport for London expired.

Fleet
As of June 2013 the fleet consisted of 1,034 buses, the majority passed on to Tower Transit & Metroline West, some were retained to operate routes out of Dagenham before moving on to other First operations.

First Capital East Limited
Operated one bus garage in Dagenham.

Dagenham (DM)
Dagenham garage operated London bus routes 165, 179 and 252, and 24-hour route 365 until 27 September 2013 when their contracts expired. They all passed to Stagecoach London.

History
Previously operated a garage in Harold Wood which closed in 2004, and was an outstation of Dagenham.

On 26 March 2011, First Capital commenced operating route 368.

On 3 September 2011, First Capital commenced operating routes 608 and 648.

On 10 March 2012, First Capital commenced operating route 667.

On 30 March 2012, the Northumberland Park allocation for route 58 was transferred.

On 22 June 2013, routes 193, 368, 498 plus school routes 608, 646, 648, 652, 656, 667, 679 and 686 passed to Blue Triangle.

On 17 August 2013, Essex route 265 passed to Amber Coaches.

First Capital North Limited
Operated one bus garage, sold to Tower Transit on 22 June 2013.

Lea Interchange (LI)
Lea Interchange garage in Leyton operated London bus routes 26, 30, 58, 236, 308, 339, RV1, W14, W15, 24-hour route 25, night bus N26 and school route 686.

History

The garage opened in 2007 to replace the Waterden Road, Stratford garage that closed as part of the development of the Olympic Park for the 2012 Olympic and Paralympic Games. Waterden Road was opened in 1996 after a number tender wins. In 2004 the garage received Mercedes-Benz Citaro Hydrogen buses for evaluation on route 25 and subsequently on route RV1.

On 25 June 2011, First Capital commenced operating routes 25, 26, 30 and N26. On 17 September 2011 routes D6, D7 and D8 passed to Docklands Buses.

On 25 February 2012, First Capital commenced operating route W14 and on 3 March 2012 route W15.

On 3 March 2012, route 309 passed to CT Plus and W11 to Arriva London.

CentreWest London Buses Limited
Operated seven bus garages. In June 2013 Alperton, Greenford, Hayes, Uxbridge and Willesden Junction were sold to Metroline and Atlas Road and Westbourne Park to Tower Transit.

Atlas Road (AS)

Atlas Road garage in Park Royal operated London bus routes 28, 31, 328, 24-hour route 266 and night routes N28 and N31.

History
On 1 October 2011 this depot opened when part of Westbourne Park depot was closed to make way for Crossrail construction with operation of routes 28, 31, 328, N28 and N31 transferred. Atlas Road operated as an outstation for Westbourne Park, so buses were seen on Atlas Road routes and vice versa.

On 19 May 2012, First London commenced operating route 266.

Greenford (G)

Greenford garage operated London bus routes 92, 95, 282, E1, E3, E5, E7, E9 and E10.

History
Greenford bus depot is part of a local council depot and was first used in 1993 as a midibus base. The opening of Greenford garage led to the closure of Hanwell, and in 1995 the garage was operating 110 midibuses. The standard fare of vehicles in the late 1990s were Renault/Wrightbus midibuses, and Marshall minibuses but both types had a bad reputation and did not last long. In recent years the allocation has been much diverse, ranging from Marshall bodied Dennis Darts to Dennis Trident 2/Plaxton vehicles.

From late 2003 until 14 March 2009 Ealing Community Transport operated London Buses route 195 from the Greenford depot using garage code EY.

On 13 November 2010, route 92 was transferred to this garage. On 2 July 2011, route 105 passed to Metroline.

Hayes (HS)
Hayes garage operated London bus route 195, 207, 427 and night route N207.

On 13 November 2010, route 195 was transferred to this garage.

Alperton (ON)

Alperton garage operated London bus routes 223, 224, 245, 487 and 24-hour route 83.

History
It was one of three garages built by the LPTB, and the only one to survive, Alperton Garage opened in June 1939, adjacent to the Piccadilly line station of the same name, to serve the extensive local area that had built up in the mid 1930s.

When it opened it had an allocation entirely of STL's which were reshuffled from Cricklewood, Hanwell, Harrow Weald, and Willesden garages. As Alperton was a new garage and had plenty of headroom it was one of the few garages able to take utility Guy Arabs, and at one stage these made up its complete allocation and lasted until 1954 when they were replaced by STLs.

By 1972 with the arrival of numerous AEC MB and SM class single deck buses to operate the numerous one man operation services, and the further allocation of Daimler Fleetline DMS, parking space was becoming a problem. It therefore became necessary to park a dozen or so buses on nearby Glacier Metals' car park overnight. The garage was consequently enlarged between 1976 and 1978, which encompassed the adjacent former Underground substation, and the London Transport Lifts and Escalators department which had to move out to new premises. During the reconstruction works, 18 vehicles were outstationed at Stonebridge (SE).

The last RT buses were transferred out in 1975, and until the beginning of the 1980s, Alperton had an entirely AEC Routemaster and Daimler Fleetline allocation. The first MCW Metrobuses arrived in 1981, and gradually replaced the DMS on all the routes, and would become the mainstay of the fleet for many years.

Following the September 1982 service reductions, all the remaining RMs were transferred away to other garages, route 187 and 83 became one manned at the same time. Replacement Metrobuses were allocated to make up the allocation mainly used vehicles from Edgware (EW), Hanwell (HL), and Fulwell (FW), making the garage all Metrobus.

By 1995, Alperton was doing most of the maintenance for the CentreWest operation and had also become the home of the training fleet.

On 26 November 2011, route 79 passed to Metroline. On 28 April 2012, route 487 was transferred to this garage.

Uxbridge (UX)

Uxbridge garage operated London bus routes 331, 607, A10, U1, U2, U3, U4, U5 and U10.

History
The original Uxbridge Garage was around half a mile out of town on the Oxford road and was built by the LGOC in 1921, but passed to Thames Valley a year later. The garage was taken back by the LGOC in 1929 to work its new local routes which were operated mainly by single deckers. An extension was added in the late 1940s and a new garage was planned, although work didn't begin until the 1980s. The new garage came into commission in late 1983 and is situated next to the underground station occupying the lower ground floor of a multi use building. In 1989 the garage began operating the U-Line network of local routes using 16 seater Mercedes Alexander midibuses (MAs) in an initiative by London Transport. The growth of use of the U-Line services over the years since 1989 has meant that larger buses have been put into service on these routes, in particular the U4 which has seen upgrades from MA's to DMLs (older Marshall versions) to the current fleet of double deck TNs. The garage also operated the busy 207 and (since 1991) the express version 607 from Uxbridge to Shepherd's Bush (extended to White City Bus Station/Westfield London shopping centre since January 2009). In 1994 the garage was allocated some of London's first low-floor single decker, Dennis Lance SLF/Wright-bodied vehicles with CentreWest branding for the then operated route 222.

Westbourne Park (X)

Westbourne Park garage operated London bus routes 9 (Heritage), 70 and 24-hour routes 23 and 295.

History
Westbourne Park Garage was part of the re-construction programme undertaken by London Transport in the early 1980s. As was common practice at the time, the new garage replaced two older garages - the small and inadequate Middle Row (X), and the larger former trolley bus depot at Stonebridge (SE). The new garage, which opened in 1981 in Great Western Road, and is of unusual design in that it is built beneath the elevated A40 Westway, the roof of the garage being profiled to match the concrete flyover. Originally, the garage allocation consisted of AEC Routemasters, and a small number of Daimler Fleetlines to B20 "quiet" specification for Route 18. These were supplemented in 1983 by a number of Leyland Titan of T class for comparative trials.

When privatised Westbourne Park operated two routes operated by AEC Routemasters, 7 and 23. These were replaced by Dennis Trident 2s in July 2004 and September 2003 respectively. In November 2005 Westbourne Park commenced operating 9 Heritage with Routemasters.

In November 2000, First CentreWest commenced operating route 27. This passed to London United in November 2005.

In November 2002, First London commenced operating route 414. This passed to Abellio London in November 2009.

In February 2003, First CentreWest commenced operating route 10. This passed to Transdev London in January 2010.

In 2006, an arson attack destroyed around ten buses. In June 2007 routes 7 and N7 passed to Metroline.

On 23 June 2012, First London commenced operating route 70.

Willesden Junction (WJ)
Willesden Junction garage operated London bus routes 18, 187, 206, 226, 228 and night route N18.

History
On 13 November 2010, N18 was transferred to this garage.

On 28 April 2012, First London commenced operating route 206.

References

External links

website

FirstGroup bus operators in England
Former London bus operators
1997 establishments in England
2013 disestablishments in England